Walter Johnson (b. in Columbia, Missouri) is an American historian, and a professor of History and of African and African-American Studies at Harvard University, where he has also directed the Charles Warren Center for Studies in American History.

Life
Walter Johnson was born in Columbia, Missouri.  His father, Walter L. Johnson, was a professor of economics at the University of Missouri. The auditorium in which he taught was later named in his honor.  His mother, Mary-Angela Johnson, was director of the Children's House Montessori School, and a member of the boards of both the Columbia Housing Authority and the Boone County Public Library.  His brother is the noted angling author and horseman Willoughby Johnson.

Johnson is married to Harvard historian Alison Frank Johnson. Their family includes five children and two dogs.

Education
Johnson was educated at the University of Missouri Laboratory School, West Junior High School, and Rock Bridge High School, all in Columbia, Missouri.  In 2006 he was inducted into the Rock Bridge High School Hall of Fame, along with NASCAR Superstar Carl Edwards.  Johnson holds degrees from Amherst College, the University of Cambridge, and Princeton University, where he received a Ph.D. in History under the direction of Professor Nell Irvin Painter in 1995.

Career
Johnson began his teaching career in the History Department at New York University in 1995, and taught there until 2006.  In 2000, he accepted a joint appointment in NYU's American Studies program, which he directed during the academic year 2005-2006.  In 2006, Johnson accepted an appointment as Professor of History and African and African American Studies at Harvard University.  In 2008, he became the Winthrop Professor of History, and in 2012 he assumed the directorship of the Charles Warren Center for the Study of American History.

Scholarship
Johnson's work focuses on the history of slavery, capitalism, white supremacy, Black resistance, and US imperialism.

Soul by Soul
His first book, Soul by Soul: Life Inside the Antebellum Slave Market was published by Harvard University Press in 1999.  The book won several prizes: the American Studies Association’s John Hope Franklin Prize; the Organization of American Historians’ Frederick Jackson Turner and Avery O. Craven Prizes; the Southern Historical Association’s Francis B. Simkins Prize; the Society of Historians of the Early American Republic’s SHEAR Book Prize; and the Thomas J. Wilson Prize from Harvard University Press. It was also a selection of the History Book Club.

Johnson based Soul by Soul upon the records of the Louisiana Supreme Court, the nineteenth-century narratives of former slaves, slaveholders’ personal records, and the economic documentation produced by the trade itself. He developed the book over years, beginning with ideas he explored first in a seminar on Southern History taught by Nell Irvin Painter. He enlarged that through research and made it the topic of his 1995 Princeton Ph.D. dissertation.

In this book, Johnson took up and engaged with many of the themes which had occupied historians of slavery in the thirty years before it was published.  The book was among the first in the historiography of slavery in the United States to place the question of capitalism and the market at the heart of its investigation of slavery.  By demonstrating the extent to which slaveholders' identities were embodied in their slaves, it also explored the master-slave dialectic and the relationship between slaveholding households and the slave market.  By following slaves’ efforts to forge human connections amidst the violent dislocation of the slave trade, it provided an account of the ability of "the slave community" to reproduce itself over time and space. It explored slaveholders' gendered fantasies about the slave market, describing the questions they asked and the examinations they made in the slave market. In this way, it investigated the daily reproduction of racist ideas about medicine, management, and sexuality in the institution that was at the heart of the slaveholding economy.  By recovering traces of slaves' efforts to shape their own sales, it altered the central symbol of slavery's brutality by placing it in a history of opposition, resistance, and manipulation.  In noting the vulnerability of slaveholders' identities, which were dependent upon slaves for their performance, Johnson sought to explain the extraordinary violence that characterized all of antebellum slavery.

Walter Johnson’s Soul by Soul: Life Inside the Antebellum Slave Market breaks down the New Orleans slave market, specifically how slave traders turned humans into products for sale. Johnson begins by describing the daily practice of slave pens, how slaves were treated and categorized in ways to make them more appealing to slave traders. This practice of categorizing slaves is what allowed traders to differentiate the monetary value of each slave. As Johnson put it “This daily dialectic of categorization and differentiation was the magic by which the traders turned people into things and then into money” (pg.11). Once Johnson established this point, he explains how traders begin to prepare slaves for sale. The process itself begins before they ever reach shore. In fact, the treatment they receive is modified as they begin to approach their destination. Everything from the way they are restrained, the clothes, hygiene even the diet they receive gets altered to make the slaves more appealing to the buyers.

Johnson goes on to elaborate on the treatment of slaves once they are sold at auctions. A major point he discusses is the detailed records kept by these slaveholders. These records contained notes of doctor visits, clothing, punishments, even the types of chains used to shackle the enslaved. The doctor visits however were never really for the benefit of the slave more for the slaveholder in order for them to get the maximum use of their purchase. Johnson uses the example of a slave named Harriet and her owner John White’s account book of her. Sadly, when all efforts to cure Harriet failed the only comfort she received was in the form of alcohol and buried once she passed (pg.12). Although she had children they were not as valuable as she was, so they were sold as quickly as possible and received no treatment. For slaveholders the alternative to caring for sick slaves was to sell them quickly. These ledgers also served as a form of accounting when slaves were sold. These ledgers contained all the ‘upgrades’ done to or for the slave to secure their sale. An interesting point Johnson makes is how this suggest a form of paternalism.

Paternalism promoted the institution of slavery by allowing an incredibly horrific situation to continue because that specific slave owner felt they were “helping” the slave out of a worse situation. In other words, these were the people who can be viewed as the enablers, they allowed for this practice to seem okay and continue because in their minds they weren’t the bad guys. Like Johnson’s excerpt explains, this practice was a way to spread proslavery propaganda and fiction. It deluded the slave buyers into believing they were not a part of the problem but that somehow, they were contributing to the “well-being” of these slaves. The traders highlighted their domesticity and ability to help care for families so that the buyers would connect to them.

Despite the efforts of slave owners to make their salves more appealing for sale, Johnson explains how an 1829 Louisiana law made it illegal to separate children under the age of ten from their mothers. As he explains it, “What the law did was to give legal credence to the categories according to which slave traders did their business” (pg.14). For the traders who travel long distances young children would only be a hindrance and separation was seen as a benefit to these men. So, as with many laws, slave traders found loopholes and often practiced this forbidden act in the upper south, out of the effective reach of the law (pg.14). However, a slave’s appealing appearance was only one of the ways they were categorized for sale.

Johnson explains how “As well as packaging the slaves into salable lots, the traders packed them 
into racial categories” (pg.15). These races were described by words like negro, griffe, mulatto, or quadroon. These words were explicitly biological. Johnson explains how value in the slave market emerged from this categorization of the slaves. As with any business, even in the business of selling humans, there are always kinks. Johnson describes one constraint facing a slaveholder when trying to sell a slave is the inquiry as to why they need to be sold in the first place. This is a valid point because as he mentioned earlier in his writing, selling a sick slave quickly is the alternative to having to care for them. He points out how traders sometimes knowingly buy the sick on the cheap only to sell them at premium prices (pg.16). Johnson uses this point to provide various examples of different explanations used by different slave traders to validate their reason for sale. Ironically most of the reasons made up by owners could be false so really, they were worthless statements, but the traders were only bound by the story they wrote down and signed.

Articles
Johnson published an article titled "On Agency" in the Journal of Social History in 2003. It is a historiographical and theoretical consideration of the notion of "agency" central to a large body of scholarship in the Humanities and Social Sciences.  It is not, as it is sometimes understood to be, a blanket condemnation of the writing of "history from the bottom up," but rather a call for a more critical attention to the terms in which that history is written.  “Agency,” Johnson argues, has come to aggregate too many different sorts of actions under one heading, thus losing the ability to distinguish between different sorts of material contexts, cultural framings, and political purposes.  "On Agency," is a critique of the crypto-liberal philosophical premises of progressive historiography, and a call for what the historian Richard White termed a more "radical" approach to the writing of history.

Johnson's article "The Pedestal and the Veil" was published in the Journal of the Early Republic in 2004.  The piece develops a consideration of Marx's treatment of cotton and slavery in the first volume of Capital into a critique of the orthodox analytical separation of “slavery” and “capitalism” into separate stages of economic development.  The piece suggests that, while the nineteenth century developed a hard-and-fast ideological distinction between the two which has made its way into the work of many subsequent historians, in historical fact slavery and industry were so deeply intertwined that they should be considered as differentiated aspects of a single economic system.

River of Dark Dreams

River of Dark Dreams: Slavery and Empire in the Cotton Kingdom was published by Harvard University Press in 2013.  In it, Johnson seeks to empirically substantiate some of the conceptual arguments made in his articles from the preceding decade, as well as to resituate the historiography of nineteenth-century slavery in the history of the global economy of the nineteenth century.  Where much of Johnson's earlier work had been framed around the consideration of various notions of historical time, River of Dark Dreams is a book about space: the material space of the landscape of the cotton South, the economic space of the Atlantic World, and the imagined space of white supremacy and pro-slavery imperialism. River of Dark Dreams: Slavery and Empire in the Cotton Kingdom (2013) won the 2013 SHEAR Book Prize and received an Honorable Mention for the 2014 Avery O. Craven Prize from the Organization of American Historians. It was also a Choice Outstanding Academic Title for 2013.

The "New History of Capitalism" and "Racial Capitalism"

While Johnson's work is often described as an example of the "New History of Capitalism," Johnson himself rejects that label.  He emphasizes his indebtedness to a historiographical tradition dating back to W. E. B. Du Bois's 1899 The Suppression of the African Slavery Trade to the United States of America and, especially, Du Bois's 1935 Black Reconstruction, and especially to Du Bois's emphasis on the ineluctably racial character of capitalism, and on the experience and historical action of working people, especially African American working people.  Among his principal scholarly influences, Johnson cites Du Bois, Cedric Robinson, Nell Irvin Painter, Robin D. G. Kelley, David Roediger, George Lipsitz, Daniel Rodgers, Richard White, Lisa Lowe, Adam Green, and Stephanie Smallwood.  Writing at length in the Boston Review, Johnson has recently invoked the models of Du Bois and Cedric Robinson in proposing that the historiography of slavery be reframed around the idea of "racial capitalism."

Controversy

Economic Historians, within a competing discipline "whose own scholarship stakes out similar turf," have been critical of works in "the New History of Capitalism" such as Johnson's River of Dark Dreams, claiming errors in economic arguments found in these books undercut their conclusions.  While acknowledging that River of Dark Dreams misstates the Latin name of Upland Cotton and, for certain scholars, may provide a mathematically incorrect account of the way that slaveholders calculated the productivity of their land and their slaves, Johnson has nevertheless maintained that errors in applying an empirical framework do not substantially or even meaningfully alter the book's interpretation of the social and economic history of cotton and slavery.

Awards

Professor Johnson has received numerous awards and honors, including a Guggenheim Fellowship, fellowships from the American Philosophical Society, the Radcliffe Institute, and the Center for Advanced Study in the Behavioral Sciences, an ACLS-Burkhardt Fellowship, and a Mellon Fellowship in Cultural Studies at Wesleyan University.

Works
 
 
 
 
"State of the Field: Slavery" (2004), Organization of American Historians

Anthologies

References

People from Columbia, Missouri
Rock Bridge High School alumni
21st-century American historians
21st-century American male writers
Amherst College alumni
Princeton University alumni
New York University faculty
Harvard University faculty
Wesleyan University people
Year of birth missing (living people)
Living people
American male non-fiction writers